The 2004 CONCACAF Women's Pre-Olympic Tournament was an international football tournament that was held in Costa Rica from 25 February to 5 March 2004. The eight national teams involved in the tournament were required to register a squad of up to 20 players. Only players in these squads were eligible to take part in the tournament.

The age listed for each player is on 25 February 2004, the first day of the tournament. The numbers of caps and goals listed for each player do not include any matches played after the start of the tournament. The club listed is the club for which the player last played a competitive match prior to the tournament. A flag is included for coaches who are of a different nationality to their team.

Group A

Canada
Manager:  Even Pellerud

Canada named their final squad on 18 February 2004.

Costa Rica
Manager: Ricardo Rodríguez

Costa Rica named their final squad on 16 February 2004.

Jamaica
Manager: Christopher Bender

Jamaica named an 18-player squad for the tournament.

Panama
Manager: Ezequiel Fernández

Panama named a 20-player squad for the tournament.

Group B

Haiti
Manager: Sonche Pierre

Haiti named a 19-player squad for the tournament.

Mexico
Manager: Leonardo Cuéllar

Trinidad and Tobago
Manager: Jamaal Shabazz

United States
Manager: April Heinrichs

The United States named their final squad on 10 February 2004.

References

Squads